The Best: Make the Music Go Bang! is a compilation album by American rock band X, released July 27, 2004, by Elektra Records/Rhino Entertainment. The album included liner notes by Tony Alva, K. K. Barrett, Tito Larriva, Ray Manzarek, Paul Reubens and Henry Rollins, among others.

Track listing
All songs were written by Exene Cervenka and John Doe, except where noted.

Disc 1
"Adult Books (Single Version)" – 3:14 (from "Adult Books" single, 1978)
"We're Desperate (Single Version)" – 2:03 (B-side to "Adult Books")
"Los Angeles" – 2:24 (from Los Angeles album, 1980)
"Your Phone's off the Hook, but You're Not" – 2:25 (Los Angeles)
"Johny Hit and Run Paulene" – 2:50 (Los Angeles)
"Soul Kitchen" – 2:26 (Los Angeles) (written by the Doors)
"The World's a Mess; It's in My Kiss" – 4:28 (Los Angeles)
"The Unheard Music" – 4:45 (Los Angeles)
"White Girl (Single Mix)" – 3:29 (from "White Girl" single, 1980)
"The Once Over Twice" – 2:31 (from Wild Gift album, 1981)
"Universal Corner" – 4:33 (Wild Gift)
"Some Other Time" – 2:17 (Wild Gift)
"In This House That I Call Home" – 3:33 (Wild Gift)
"Beyond and Back (Live in August, 1980 at the Santa Monica Civic Auditorium)" – 2:41 (from Urgh! A Music War soundtrack, 1981)
"Riding with Mary (Single Version)" – 3:12 (from "Riding with Mary" single, 1983)
"The Hungry Wolf" – 3:47 (from Under the Big Black Sun album, 1982)
"Motel Room in My Bed" – 2:41 (Under the Big Black Sun)
"Blue Spark" – 2:08 (Under the Big Black Sun)
"The Have Nots" – 4:46 (Under the Big Black Sun)
"Under the Big Black Sun" – 3:24 (Under the Big Black Sun)
"The New World" – 3:25 (From More Fun in the New World album, 1983)
"Breathless" – 2:19 (More Fun in the New World) (written by Otis Blackwell)
"We're Having Much More Fun" – 3:08 (More Fun in the New World)
"True Love" – 2:15 (More Fun in the New World)
"I Must Not Think Bad Thoughts" – 4:15 (More Fun in the New World)

Disc 2
"Wild Thing (7" Single Edit)" – 3:33 (from "Wild Thing" single, 1984; written by Chip Taylor)
"Poor Girl" – 2:53 (More Fun in the New World)
"The Call of the Wreckin' Ball" – 2:57 (performed by the Knitters; from Poor Little Critter on the Road album, 1985; written by Dave Alvin and John Doe)
"Someone Like You" – 2:42 (Poor Little Critter on the Road)
"What's Wrong with Me..." – 3:45 (from Ain't Love Grand! album, 1985)
"Burning House of Love" – 3:55 (Ain't Love Grand)
"My Goodness" – 4:37 (Ain't Love Grand)
"4th of July" – 4:06 (from See How We Are album, 1987; written by Dave Alvin)
"You"– 3:30 (See How We Are)
"When It Rains..." – 4:33 (See How We Are)
"Surprise Surprise" – 2:52 (See How We Are)
"I'm Lost" – 2:57 (See How We Are)
"See How We Are" – 3:49 (See How We Are)
"Skin Deep Town (Live in December, 1987 at the Whisky a Go Go)" – 3:19 (from Live at the Whisky a Go-Go album, 1988)
"Around My Heart (Live in December, 1987 at the Whisky a Go Go)" – 4:26  
"Just Another Perfect Day (Live in December, 1987 at the Whisky a Go Go)" – 4:34  
"Devil Doll (Live in December, 1987 at the Whisky a Go Go)" – 4:39  
"Big Blue House" – 4:05 (from Hey Zeus! album, 1993)
"Clean Like Tomorrow" – 3:58 (Hey Zeus!; written by Exene Cervenka)
"Country at War" – 4:15 (Hey Zeus!; written by John Doe)
"New Life" – 3:24 (Hey Zeus!; written by John Doe)

References

External links
 

2004 greatest hits albums
Albums produced by Tony Berg
Albums produced by Michael Wagener
Rhino Records compilation albums
X (American band) compilation albums
Elektra Records compilation albums
Albums produced by Ray Manzarek